Charlemont Fort was a garrison situated in Charlemont, County Armagh.

History

The fort was built in 1602 by Lord Mountjoy. The name Charlemont came from Charles Blount's Christian name. It was situated on the Armagh bank of the River Blackwater, it was armed with 150 men under the command of Sir Toby Caulfield, whose descendants took the name Charlemont from the place.

The Stronghold of Charlemont proved to be of great strategic importance in the Irish Confederate Wars in the 1640s, as it was one of only a handful of modern fortresses to be found in Ireland at that time. It was captured by the forces of Felim O'Neill in 1641 and the Ulster army of the Irish Confederates managed to hold on to the fort throughout the 1640s. O'Neill's forces were able to capture the fort by exploiting his landed status, calling on Lord Caulfield for dinner. It was eventually captured by Charles Coote after he had been reinforced by New Model Army soldiers in late 1650, but hundreds of Coote's soldiers were killed in the effort.

During the 1689-1691 Williamite War in Ireland, it was occupied by a Jacobite force under Teague O'Reagan; while the defences were strong, the garrison was short of provisions and it surrendered to Williamite forces in April 1690. 

The fort ceased to be used as a garrison on 14 February 1858. It was destroyed in 1920 by fire and the only building remaining today is the gatehouse.

Governors
Governors of Charlemont included:
Henry Barry, 3rd Baron Barry of Santry
1719: John Tichborne
 bef. 1756: John Johnston (d. 1770)
8 September 1770: James Gisborne
27 February 1778: Lieut-General Guy Carleton, 1st Baron Dorchester
12 November 1808: Chapple Norton
31 March 1818: Albemarle Bertie, 9th Earl of Lindsey
21 September 1818: Sir John Doyle, 1st Baronet

Destruction
On 30 July 1920 a group of around forty armed from the Irish Republican Army men seized the fort, which was being occupied by a caretaker, and burned it down.  The ruins were sold in 1921 to a masonry contractor.  In 1922 the family also lost their great house Roxborough Castle to the same fate.

References

External links

See also
Siege of Charlemont

Ruins in Northern Ireland
Barracks in Northern Ireland
Castles in County Armagh
Buildings and structures in the United Kingdom destroyed by arson

1602 establishments in Ireland